The 14th European Cross Country Championships were held at Toro in Spain on 9 December 2007. Serhiy Lebid took his seventh title in the men's competition and Marta Domínguez won the women's race.

Results

Men individual 10.7 km

Total 57 competitors

Men teams

Total 9 teams

Women individual 8.2 km

Total 46 competitors

Women teams

Total 6 teams

Men U23 individual 8.2 km

Total 77 competitors

Men U23 teams

Total 12 teams

Women U23 individual 6.7 km

Total 67 competitors

Women U23 teams

Total 11 teams

Junior men individual 6.7 km

Total 89 teams

Junior men teams

Total 14 teams

Junior women individual 4.2 km

Total 87 competitors

Junior women teams

Total 13 teams

References

External links
 14th European Cross Country Championships at the EAA
 14th European Cross Country Championships at the RFEA
 Database containing all results between 1994–2007

European Cross Country Championships
European Cross Country Championships
Cross country running in Spain
2007 in Spanish sport